This is a list of franchise records for the Columbus Blue Jackets of the National Hockey League (updated through January 23, 2020).

Career regular season leaders

†As of April 10, 2021

‡Minimum 75 games played with the franchise

Career playoff leaders

Single season records

Team 

†Shootouts did not exist until the 2005–2006 season.

‡Excluding the shortened seasons 1994–95 (lockout), 2012–13 (lockout), and the 2019-2020 (pandemic)

Skaters 

†Minimum 1 shot per team game.

‡Minimum 25 games played.

Goalies 

†Minimum 25 games played.

Single game records

Team

Skaters

Goalies 

†Shootouts did not exist until the 2005–2006 season.

See also 
List of Columbus Blue Jackets players
List of Columbus Blue Jackets seasons

References
 Hockey-Reference Play Index
 NHL Player Statistics
 Columbus Blue Jackets 2016-17 Media Guide

External links
Hockey-Reference – Columbus Blue Jackets Franchise Index

Records
National Hockey League statistical records